Glarryford railway station served the hamlet of Glarryford in County Antrim, Northern Ireland..

History

The station was opened by the Ballymena, Ballymoney, Coleraine and Portrush Junction Railway on 1 July 1856. It was taken over by the Northern Counties Committee in January 1861.

The station closed to passengers on 2 July 1973.

References 

Disused railway stations in County Antrim
Railway stations opened in 1856
Railway stations closed in 1973
1856 establishments in Ireland
1973 disestablishments in Northern Ireland
Railway stations in Northern Ireland opened in the 19th century